East Fairfield is an unincorporated community in Fairfield Township, Columbiana County, Ohio, United States. The community is located at the intersection of Ohio State Routes 7, 517, and 558.

History
East Fairfield was laid out in 1803. With the construction of the railroad, business activity shifted away from inland East Fairfield, and the town's population dwindled. A post office called East Fairfield was established in 1828, and remained in operation until 1906. Today, it is home to a few small businesses, farms, as well as a church.

References

Unincorporated communities in Ohio
Unincorporated communities in Columbiana County, Ohio
1803 establishments in Ohio